The Smell of the Kill is a play by Michele Lowe that premiered at Cleveland Play House in 1999. It opened on Broadway at the Helen Hayes Theatre in March 2002. The cast starred Lisa Emery, Claudia Shear and Jessica Stone, with direction by Christopher Ashley.  

It closed after 40 performances.

References

External links 
 
Synopsis, dramaticpublishing.com

Broadway plays
1999 plays